Tim Janus (born December 31, 1976) is an American entertainer, media personality and retired competitive eater known in the competitive eating community as "Eater X". He was a member of the International Federation of Competitive Eating (IFOCE). He performed in contests wearing a painted mask and once stated, "I'd eat anything. One of my goals in life is to eat everything in the world at least once. I'd eat a roll of pennies if I thought I could set a world record. Some day I hope we make contact with beings from other planets. I'd love to eat alien."

Career
The IFOCE's 2004 Rookie of the Year, in the summer of 2005 Janus advanced to the Final Four of the inaugural Alka Seltzer U.S. Open of Competitive Eating, a single-elimination tournament featuring 32 of the world's best eaters. He is the current tiramisu, ramen noodles, and nigiri sushi-eating champion of the world.

In 2006, Janus was featured on the show "True Life: I'm a Competitive Eater" along with then world-champion hot-dog eater Takeru Kobayashi. The show showcased his daily life, including his training for different events.

In 2007, Tim was a test subject in a documentary, The Science of Speed Eating from National Geographic. He underwent an upper gastrointestinal series and was shown to have a stomach that expands four times larger than a normal stomach. His digestive rate of the stomach was also slower than a normal human.

On July 4, 2007, just before the release of the final Harry Potter book, Janus appeared on-stage at the Nathan's Hot Dog Eating Contest with a sign saying "Hermione dies". Janus would later admit that the stunt led to rules against signage at competitive eating events, and that he suffered a significant amount of personal backlash for the prank.

On September 22, Janus ate 10¾ 18-ounce burritos (made of rice, black beans, pork, cheese and a mild sauce wrapped in a tortilla) in a 12 minutes to win the $3,000 Costa Vida world burrito-eating championship.

On November 21, 2007, Janus helped draw attention to the plight of New York City's homeless by consuming a Thanksgiving meal for four, including a 10-pound turkey, four pounds of mashed potatoes, three pounds of cranberry sauce, 2½ pounds of beans, and a pumpkin pie. The IFOCE donated $6,000 to Second Harvest, a hunger-relief organization, to celebrate the accomplishment. Second Harvest estimated that the donation would provide 30,000 meals to area residents.

On May 16, 2009, Janus became the third person in the history of the world to eat 50 or more hot dogs and buns in a Nathan's Hot Dog Eating Contest, consuming exactly 50 in his qualifier in Hartford, Connecticut. In the finals on July 4, he ate 53 hot dogs.

On July 4, 2010, Eater X placed second at the Nathan's Hot Dog Eating Contest by eating 45 hot dogs and losing to Joey Chestnut who ate 54 hot dogs and buns.

In an August 24, 2010, episode of Shaq Vs. on ABC, Tim coached a team led by Shaquille O'Neal to victory in a hot dog eating contest against Joey Chestnut.

He is the current champion of the Doodle Challenge, a hamburger eating contest in Connecticut.

Janus appeared in the music video for the Boston Spaceships song "Let it Rest for a Little While" from the band's 2009 album "Zero to 99".

On October 13, 2012, Janus tied for second place with Bob Shoudt in the World Poutine Eating Championship, after eating 8.5 lbs of poutine (or 17 boxes) in 10 minutes.

Janus announced his retirement from competitive eating on July 3, 2016 via Twitter. He said that "I've wondered how long-term stupid competing is for my health. I can't ignore that feeling anymore."

On December 7, 2017, it was announced that Janus and Joey Chestnut would be competing on the 30th season of The Amazing Race.

World records
Tiramisu: 4 pounds Tiramisu in 6 minutes on March 5, 2005
Tamales: 71 in 10 minutes on September 1, 2007
Cannoli: 26 six-inch cannoli in 6 minutes on September 15, 2006
Burritos: 10.75 eighteen-ounce burritos (12.1 lb) in 12 minutes on September 22, 2007
Ramen noodles: 10.5 lbs. noodles using chopsticks in 8 minutes on October 27, 2007
Fried pork rinds: 14.3 oz. in 6 minutes on January 31, 2008
Nigiri sushi: 141 pieces nigiri sushi in 6 minutes on April 11, 2008
Boneless Buffalo wings: 7.719 pounds in 12 minutes on May 8, 2010
Chili: 2 gallons in 6 minutes on October 7, 2012

Game show appearances
Tim appeared on the syndicated version of Who Wants to Be a Millionaire in 2009, winning $100,000 before choosing to walk away, although he had surmised the correct answer to the $250,000 question. Millionaire at the time had an event called the Million Dollar Tournament of 10 where the ten highest earning contestants from the season's first 45 shows will return for a chance to answer a million dollar question, and Janus qualified as the fifth seed for the Million Dollar Prize.
He returned on November 16 to answer his Million Dollar Question.
{| cellpadding="5" cellspacing="2" width="500" style="background:#FFFFFF"
|- style=text-align:center; bgcolor="CFB53B"
| colspan=2| <span style="color:white;">'$1 Million (Tournament of 10 #5) - 3:16 time limit (0:45+2:31 banked)</span>
|- style=text-align:center; bgcolor="00008B"
| colspan=2|  Who once wrote, "'Bartlett's Familiar Quotations' is an admirable work," a quotation now listed in "Bartlett's Familiar Quotations"?
|- style=text-align:left; bgcolor="00008B"
|width="50%"|• A:   Truman Capote
|style=text-align:left; bgcolor="00008B "|• B:  John Lennon
|- style=text-align:left; bgcolor="green"
|• C:  Winston Churchill
|style=text-align:left; bgcolor="00008B"|• D:   Mark Twain
|}

As the game progressed, he first said that he knew the answer to the question, but it was later revealed that he was toying with Meredith, as a response to her "tricking" contestants in the Hot Seat. He had an inkling towards Winston Churchill (which was the correct answer) but decided to walk away because he was not even sure and because of the money at risk.

He also won $1600 on the Discovery Channel show Cash Cab with Ben Bailey.

Professional burping
On June 8, 2012, in New York City, Janus was crowned World Burping Champion by the World Burping Federation after he produced a single, continuous burp lasting 18.1 seconds.

On July 19, 2012, Janus appeared on The Tonight Show with Jay Leno to burp for William Shatner.

Getting drunk on non-alcoholic beer
On August 28, 2013, Deadspin released a video of Janus' attempt to become, in his words, "the first person in the history of the world to get legally drunk (.08) on" non-alcoholic beer. In the video, Janus drinks 28 cans and bottles of various non-alcoholic beers and then blows into a breathalyzer. A .02 reading is recorded, leading Janus to conclude that if he can't get drunk on O'Doul's, nobody can.

Acting
Often appearing on television to talk about competitive eating, Janus began appearing on television in acting roles too. Although he usually plays himself (notably in a music video for the Boston Spaceships and in commercials for Major League Eating: The Game and ESPN's Sportscenter), in 2016 he appeared on Showtime's Billions playing a hedge fund trader named Jones. In 2016, Janus also appeared on The Eric Andre Show. 

Weatherman
In 2014, Janus began delivering weather reports when visiting local TV stations to promote contests in which he was competing. On February 8 in Orlando, Florida, he provided the weather report on FOX 35's morning news broadcast. On March 28, on a visit to WPMI in Mobile, Alabama, Tim again provided the weather forecast.

Video games
Janus appears as a character in Major League Eating: The Game,'' available on WiiWare and iTunes.

See also
 List of competitive eaters

References

External links
 Tim Janus Wins Pig Skin Contest!
 Video of Tim Janus's Million Dollar Question on Who Wants to Be a Millionaire?
 World Burping Federation
 Tim Janus weather

1976 births
Living people
Contestants on American game shows
American competitive eaters
The Amazing Race (American TV series) contestants